Terje Hanssen (born 20 September 1948 in Kabelvåg, Lofoten) is a former Norwegian biathlete. At the 1976 Winter Olympics in Innsbruck, he finished fifth with the Norwegian relay team. He received a bronze medal in the relay at the 1974 Biathlon World Championships, together with Kjell Hovda, Kåre Hovda and Tor Svendsberget.

References

1948 births
Living people
People from Vågan
Norwegian male biathletes
Olympic biathletes of Norway
Biathletes at the 1976 Winter Olympics
Biathlon World Championships medalists
Sportspeople from Nordland